Ceroplesis hintzi is a species of beetle in the family Cerambycidae. It was described by Breuning in 1937. It is known from the Democratic Republic of the Congo.

References

hintzi
Beetles described in 1937
Endemic fauna of the Democratic Republic of the Congo